The Lucanamarca massacre was a mass murder that took place in and around the town of Lucanamarca on 3 April 1983, by Sendero Luminoso terrorists. The attack, which claimed the lives of 69 members of indigenous peasant families, was ordered by the central leadership of the Shining Path in reprisal for a lynching death of its local commander.

Background 
On 17 May, 1980, the Maoist revolutionary group Shining Path went to war against the Peruvian state. The group was based in the Ayacucho Region. In March 1983, the local ronderos vigilantes captured Olegario Curitomay, a Shining Path commander in Lucanamarca, a small town in the Huanca Sancos Province of Ayacucho. Curitomay was taken to the town square, stoned, stabbed, set on fire, and finally shot.

Attack
In 3 April 1983, Shining Path militants responded to the death of Olegario Curitomay by entering Lucanamarca and the villages of Yanaccollpa, Ataccara, Llacchua, and Muylacruz, and indiscriminately killing 69 indigenous people in a revenge attack. Of those killed by the Shining Path, eighteen were children, the youngest of whom was only six months old.  Also killed were eleven women. Eight of the victims were between fifty and seventy years old. Most of the victims died by machete and axe hacks, and some were shot in the head at close range.

This was the first massacre committed by the Shining Path against members of a peasant community. Abimael Guzmán, the founder and leader of the Shining Path, admitted that the Shining Path carried out the attack and explained the rationale behind it in an interview with El Diario, a pro-Shining Path newspaper based in Lima. In the interview, he said:

Aftermath 
Ultimately, the Shining Path's war against the Peruvian state faltered, and Abimael Guzmán and several other high-ranking Shining Path members were captured in Lima in 1992. On 10 September 2002, Abimael Guzmán told the Truth and Reconciliation Commission "We, doctors, reiterate that we will not avoid our responsibility [for the Lucanamarca massacre]. I have mine, I'm the first one responsible, and I will never renounce my responsibility, that wouldn't make any sense."

On 13 October 2006, Guzmán and Elena Iparraguirre were sentenced to life imprisonment on a number of charges that included ordering the Lucanamarca massacre. Guzmán was additionally ordered to pay S./250,000 to the victims. In January 2008, the Supreme Court of Peru confirmed that Guzmán had ordered the killings and upheld his life sentence.

See also
 List of massacres in Peru
 Communist terrorism
 Red terror

References 

1983 in Peru
April 1983 crimes
Deaths by firearm in Peru
Massacres in 1983
Internal conflict in Peru
Massacres in Peru
Victims of Shining Path
Communist terrorism
Terrorist incidents in Peru
History of Ayacucho Region
1983 murders in Peru
Terrorist incidents in South America in 1983
Terrorist incidents in Peru in the 1980s